Platyrhopalus is a genus of beetles in the family Carabidae, containing the following species:

 Platyrhopalus acutidens Westwood, 1833
 Platyrhopalus cardoni Wasmann, 1904 
 Platyrhopalus castelnaudi Westwood, 1874 
 Platyrhopalus comottii Gestro, 1882 
 Platyrhopalus davidis Fairmaire, 1886 
 Platyrhopalus denticornis Donovan, 1804 
 Platyrhopalus imadatei (Chujo, 1962) 
 Platyrhopalus intermedius Benson, 1846
 Platyrhopalus irregularis Ritsema, 1880 
 Platyrhopalus mandersi Fowler, 1912 
 Platyrhopalus paussoides Wasmann, 1904 
 Platyrhopalus quinquepunctatus Shiraki, 1907 
 Platyrhopalus tonkinensis Janssens, 1948 
 Platyrhopalus westwoodii Saunders, 1838

References

Paussinae